John Thomas Arrowsmith (6 July 1887 – 1950) was a footballer who played in the Football League for Grimsby Town.

References

1887 births
1950 deaths
People from the Borough of Harrogate
English footballers
Association football fullbacks
Anston Athletic F.C. players
Worksop Town F.C. players
Grimsby Town F.C. players
English Football League players